Lozica is a village in Croatia. It is located on the D8 state road, west of Dubrovnik, on the west coast of Rijeka Dubrovačka. The Franjo Tuđman Bridge is located east of the village. 

Populated places in Dubrovnik-Neretva County